Tezozomoc was the second tlatoani (ruler) of altepetl Ecatepec, in 15th-century Mesoamerica.

Biography
Tezozomoc was a son of an Aztec tlatoani Chimalpopoca, ruler of Tenochtitlan. His mother may have been Matlalatzin.

He was a grandson of tlatoani Huitzilihuitl and Ayauhcihuatl, who was a daughter of the Tepanec tlatoani Tezozomoc, ruler of Azcapotzalco.

He was a relative of and successor tlatoani to Chimalpilli I in 1465. His successor was Matlaccohuatl.

References

Tlatoque of Ecatepec
Nahua nobility
15th-century monarchs in North America
15th-century indigenous people of the Americas
15th century in the Aztec civilization
Nobility of the Americas